The Xiang Hua Men is a Panamanian flagged cargo vessel, owned by the Nanjing Ocean Shipping Company, headquartered in Jiangsu Province, China.
She was hijacked by Somali pirates on April 7, 2012.
The capture of this large commercial vessel was described as remarkable by the ship's owners, as it was outside the "globally recognized ‘pirate zone’."

China Daily reports the nine pirates exchanged fire with Iranian commandos, from two Iranian Navy patrol vessels, prior to throwing their weapons overboard.

The Xiang Hua Men has a complement of 28 mariners.
Early reports said it was unknown if any of the crew had been injured, or what became of the pirates.
China Daily reports the crew members shut down all power systems and retreated to the ship's security room when they saw the pirates approach.

The vessel was occupied by the pirates for nine hours.
The pirates boarded the vessel 25 minutes after they were sighted, and it took them three hours to breach three of the four security doors to the ship's security room.  At that point the crew surrendered, and the pirates made them line the bridge, to serve as human shields.

The ship's captain He Feng noticed the two Iranian patrol vessels were shadowing the ship.
Ship's engineer Li Shengming told the pirates he had to take his engineering staff to the engine room, to monitor the ship's engines.
However, when the first mate, on the bridge, informed him that the Iranians had covertly requested the vessel be stopped, he and his staff stopped the engines and jumped overboard.
When members of the remaining crew were ordered to start the engines they claimed all the crew members qualified to do so were among those who had jumped overboard.

As the Iranian boarding party approached gunfire was exchanged between the pirates and the Iranian commandos.  One crew member, Li Guwen was slightly injured.

Eventually the pirates threw their weapons overboard -- four AK-47s, a "bazooka" and some pistols and knives.

China Daily reports the ship's owners has announced that all the crew members will receive a $10,000 bonus.

References

Merchant ships of Panama
Merchant ships of China
1987 ships
Ships built in Rostock